Yew Chung International School of Chongqing is an accredited K3 - Year 13 international school for boys and girls located in the Chongqing International School Garden of the city's New Northern Economic Development Zone. The school's international curriculum prepares students to become bilingually competent in English and Chinese and internationally minded.

Origins and history
The Ministry of Education of the People's Republic of China has accredited Yew Chung International School of Chongqing for the enrollment of children of foreign nationals. The bilingual (English and Mandarin) school serves students ages 3 to 19 (K3 to Year 13) and provides early childhood education or kindergarten, primary and secondary education. The international school is part of the Yew Chung Education Foundation, which operates campuses in Shanghai, Qingdao, Beijing, Hong Kong, and Northern California.

Timeline 
 2001 - YCIS Chongqing is founded
 2001 - YCIS Chongqing adapts its Co-Teaching model
 2016 - YCIS Chongqing celebrates its 15th anniversary
 2016 - YCIS Chongqing is formally accredited by three separate academic accreditation organizations (NEASC, CIS, CIE).
 2017 - YCIS Chongqing has more than 400 enrolled students

World Classroom
The World Classroom is a program that teaches YCIS students how to participate effectively in today's global society. Students in Years 7 to 10 gain experience outside of the classroom by traveling abroad with experienced faculty.  Projects such as building a new school in Tanzania or re-building homes in Thailand provide students with meaningful cultural experiences.

Accreditation 
 New England Association of Schools and Colleges (NEASC)
 Council of International Schools (CIS)
 Cambridge International Certificate of Secondary Education (IGCSE)
 International Baccalaureate Diploma Programme (IBDP)

International School Charity
After the Sichuan earthquake in 2008, Yew Chung International Schools established the Seeds of Hope charity. 'Hope Schools' are being established in various parts of rural China through a collaboration with the China Youth Development Foundation. The charity's funds are raised through charitable projects and matched by local government organizations to build Seeds of Hope Schools.

Awards 
In June 2012 Yew Chung International Schools received the "Cambridge Award for Excellence in Education", the only international school in China to receive this award.

References

 YCIS Chongqing: Chinese Culture Week http://www.aoehome.com/news-focus/YCIS-Chongqing-:Chinese-Culture-Week-1832
 Maxxelli relocation listing http://maxxelli-blog.com/2011/06/chongqing-yew-chung-international-school-2/

Network of Schools
 Yew Chung International School of Hong Kong
 Yew Chung International School of Beijing
 Yew Chung International School of Shanghai
 Yew Chung International School of Chongqing
 Yew Chung International School of Qingdao
 Yew Chung International School of Silicon Valley

External links 

 Yew Chung International School of Chongqing

International schools in China
Schools in Chongqing
Private schools in China
Cambridge schools in China
Educational institutions established in 2001
2001 establishments in China